The 33rd Los Angeles Film Critics Association Awards, given by the Los Angeles Film Critics Association (LAFCA), honored the best in film for 2007.

Winners

Best Picture:
There Will Be Blood
Runner-up: The Diving Bell and the Butterfly (Le scaphandre et le papillon)
Best Director:
Paul Thomas Anderson – There Will Be Blood
Runner-up: Julian Schnabel – The Diving Bell and the Butterfly (Le scaphandre et le papillon)
Best Actor:
Daniel Day-Lewis – There Will Be Blood
Runner-up: Frank Langella – Starting Out in the Evening
Best Actress:
Marion Cotillard – La Vie en Rose (La Môme)
Runner-up: Anamaria Marinca – 4 Months, 3 Weeks and 2 Days (4 luni, 3 săptămâni și 2 zile)
Best Supporting Actor:
Vlad Ivanov – 4 Months, 3 Weeks and 2 Days (4 luni, 3 săptămâni și 2 zile)
Runner-up: Hal Holbrook – Into the Wild
Best Supporting Actress:
Amy Ryan – Before the Devil Knows You're Dead and Gone Baby Gone
Runner-up: Cate Blanchett – I'm Not There
Best Screenplay:
Tamara Jenkins – The Savages
Runner-up: Paul Thomas Anderson – There Will Be Blood
Best Cinematography:
Janusz Kamiński – The Diving Bell and the Butterfly (Le scaphandre et le papillon)
Runner-up: Robert Elswit – There Will Be Blood
Best Production Design:
Jack Fisk – There Will Be Blood
Runner-up: Dante Ferretti – Sweeney Todd: The Demon Barber of Fleet Street
Best Music Score:
Glen Hansard and Markéta Irglová – Once
Runner-up: Jonny Greenwood – There Will Be Blood
Best Documentary/Non-Fiction Film:
No End in Sight
Runner-up: Sicko
Best Animation (TIE):
Persepolis
Ratatouille
Best Foreign Language Film:
4 Months, 3 Weeks and 2 Days (4 luni, 3 săptămâni și 2 zile) • Romania
Runner-up: The Diving Bell and the Butterfly (Le scaphandre et le papillon) • France
The Douglas Edwards Experimental/Independent Film/Video Award:
Pedro Costa – Colossal Youth (Juventude em Marcha)
New Generation Award:
Sarah Polley – Away from Her
Legacy Film Award:
Milestone Film and Video
The Outfest Legacy Project
Career Achievement Award:
Sidney Lumet
Special Citation:
The New Crowned Hope series commissioned by director Peter Sellars to honor the anniversary of Mozart's 250th birthday

References

External links
 33rd Annual Los Angeles Film Critics Association Awards

2007
Los Angeles Film Critics Association Awards
Los Angeles Film Critics Association Awards
Los Angeles Film Critics Association Awards
Los Angeles Film Critics Association Awards